{{Infobox Boxingmatch
| fight date    = September 12, 2015
| Fight Name    = High Stakes
| image         = 
| location      = MGM Grand Garden Arena, Paradise, Nevada, U.S.
| fighter1      =Floyd Mayweather Jr.
| nickname1     = Money
| record1       = 48–0 (26 KO)
| hometown1     = Las Vegas, Nevada, U.S.
| height1       = 5 ft 8 in
|weight1 = 146 lb
| style1        = Orthodox
| recognition1  = WBA (Unified), WBC, and [[List of The Ring world champions#Welterweight|The Ring]] welterweight championWBA (Super) and WBC super welterweight championThe Ring No. 1 ranked pound-for-pound fighter5-division world champion
| fighter2      =Andre Berto
|weight2 = 145 lb
| nickname2     = The Beast
| record2       = 30–3 (23 KO)
| hometown2     = Winter Haven, Florida, U.S.
| height2       = 5 ft 6+1/2 in
| style2        = Orthodox
| recognition2  = WBA interim welterweight championFormer two-time welterweight champion
| titles        = WBA (Unified), WBC, and The Ring welterweight titles
| result        =  Mayweather Jr. wins via 12-round unanimous decision (118-110, 117-111, 120-108)
}}
Floyd Mayweather Jr. vs. Andre Berto, billed as High Stakes'', was a professional boxing fight, contested for the welterweight championship. The bout was held on September 12, 2015 at the MGM Grand Garden Arena in Las Vegas, Nevada on Showtime PPV Mayweather Jr. confirmed his retirement after the bout.

Mayweather dominated the fight, landing an impressive 56% [232/410] punches thrown, and 67% of power punches [132/196] compared to Berto's underwhelming number of 16% [83/495] punches landed and 22% [39/177] of power punches thrown. Mayweather won the fight, 120-108, 118-110 and 117-111.

Fight card

Broadcast 
The telecast of the fight was televised via Showtime PPV, with its price set at US$64.99. For the first time in Showtime history, viewers were also able to purchase and watch the PPV online through the CBS website; those who purchase the fight online also received a free 3-month subscription to CBS All Access. The move to offer the fight online by official means was considered to be in response to the unauthorized redistribution of Mayweather vs. Pacquiao.

Estimates reported the number of PPV buys for the fight to be around 400,000, which was the lowest for a Mayweather fight in almost a decade.

References

Boxing matches
Berto
Boxing in Las Vegas
Boxing on Showtime
2015 in boxing
2015 in sports in Nevada
21st century in Las Vegas
September 2015 sports events in the United States
MGM Grand Garden Arena